Norman McLeod Honey (26 January 1914 – 19 June 1994) was an Australian rules footballer who played with Footscray in the Victorian Football League (VFL).

Notes

External links 

1914 births
Australian rules footballers from Victoria (Australia)
Western Bulldogs players
1994 deaths